The Honourable George Hamilton (c. 1697 – 3 May 1775) was a British politician, the second son of James Hamilton, 6th Earl of Abercorn.

He was twice Member of Parliament for Wells in the British House of Commons. Between 1727 and 1761, he represented St Johnstown (County Donegal) in the Irish House of Commons. He was known for his love of planting.

In October 1719, he married Bridget Coward (d. 1775), by whom he had eleven children:
Elizabeth Hamilton (born on 13 Nov 1720), married first in 1754 John Cameron of Glenkinday, second the Comte de Fay.
Bridget Hamilton (d. 3 April 1789), married the Rev. Thomas Finney on 7 Jan 1760 in Devon, England.
George Hamilton (b. 1721), unmarried.
Maria Hamilton (7 January 1725 – 22 July 1798), married first Francis March, second on 8 June 1756 William Beckford.
The Ven. John Hamilton (1726 – 12 August 1756), unmarried, Archdeacon of Raphoe.
Harriet Hamilton (d. 1787), married the Rev. William Peter.
Frances Hamilton (d. 1752), married William Tooker, of Chilcompton, Somerset.
Rachel Hamilton, married the Rev. Neville Walter.
Col. William Hamilton (d. June 1793), unmarried.
James Hamilton (d. 1797), died without issue.
Charlotte Hamilton, unmarried.

References

1690s births
1775 deaths
Irish MPs 1727–1760
Members of the Parliament of Great Britain for English constituencies
Members of the Parliament of Ireland (pre-1801) for County Donegal constituencies
Younger sons of earls